Gymnosoma is a genus of flies in the family Tachinidae.

The name "Gymnosoma" literally translates as "naked body", and presumably refers to the fact that some species in the genus are less conspicuously bristly than most species of flies in the family Tachinidae.

Species
G. acrosterni Kugler, 1971
G. amplifrons (Brooks, 1946)
G. brachypeltae Dupuis, 1961
G. brevicorne Villeneuve, 1929
G. canadense (Brooks, 1946)
G. carpocoride Dupuis, 1961
G. clavatum (Rohdendorf, 1947)
G. costatum (Panzer, 1800)
G. desertorum (Rohdendorf, 1947)
G. dolycoride Dupuis, 1961
G. emdeni (Mesnil, 1950)
G. filiola Loew, 1872
G. fuliginosum Robineau-Desvoidy, 1830
G. hemisphaericum (Geoffroy, 1785)
G. hamiense Dupuis, 1966
G. indicum Walker, 1853
G. inornatum Zimin, 1966
G. iranicum (Zimin, 1966)
G. majae (Zimin, 1966)
G. maxima Dupuis, 1966
G. nitens Meigen, 1824
G. nudifrons Herting, 1966
G. occidentale Curran, 1927
G. par Walker, 1849
G. persicum (Mesnil, 1952)
G. philippinense (Townsend, 1928)
G. rotundatum (Linnaeus, 1758)
G. ruficorne (Wulp, 1892)
G. rungsi (Mesnil, 1952)
G. siculum Dupuis & Genduso, 1981

References

Phasiinae
Diptera of Europe
Diptera of Asia
Diptera of Africa
Diptera of North America
Taxa named by Johann Wilhelm Meigen
Tachinidae genera